The 2014 HDF Insurance Shoot-Out was held from September 11 to 14 at the Saville Community Sports Centre in Edmonton, Alberta. The event was held on Week 3 of the 2014–15 World Curling Tour. The men's event had a purse of CAD$22,000, and the women's event had a purse of CAD$27,000. The winning team in each event won  CAD$6,000.

Local teams from Edmonton won both the men's and women's events. On the men's side, Brendan Bottcher's rink defeated Saskatchewan's Steve Laycock in an extra end. The women's side featured two Edmonton rinks, as Manitoba-transplant Chelsea Carey and her new team beat Valerie Sweeting to claim their first World Curling Tour title in their very first event as a team.

Men
The men's event has a triple knockout format, followed by an eight-team playoff.

Teams
Teams are listed as follows:

Knockout results

A event

B event

C event

Playoffs

Women
The women's event is a round robin with four pools followed by an eight-team playoff.

Teams
Teams are listed as follows:

Round-robin standings
After Draw 9

Playoffs

References

External links

2014 in Canadian curling
September 2014 sports events in Canada
The Shoot-Out